Brian Hansen (born September 3, 1990, in Evanston, Illinois) is an American speed skater and silver medalist in the Winter Olympics.

At the 2010 Winter Olympics, Hansen won a silver medal in the team pursuit along with Jonathan Kuck, Chad Hedrick and Trevor Marsicano. Hansen has also won a two medals in the World Single Distance Championships and four medals (two gold, three silver, one bronze) in the World Junior Championships. As of February 2018, Hansen holds the 13th position on the men's Adelskalender big combination.

Career

2018 Winter Olympics 

Games

Hansen qualified for the 2018 U.S. Olympic Team in the 1500 m, Mass Start, and Team Pursuit. The Olympic Mass Start team event will have its debut in Pyeongchang, South Korea.

2014 Winter Olympics 

Games

Hansen placed 7th in the men's 1500 m and men's Team Pursuit. Hansen also placed 9th in the men's 1000 m.

2010 Winter Olympics

Games
In the 1500 m, Hansen placed 18th with a time of 1:48.45.

The American pursuit team consisted of Hansen, Chad Hedrick, Jonathan Kuck and Trevor Marsicano. Kuck, Hedrick and Marsicano eliminated Japan in the quarterfinal, which advanced them to face the heavily favored Netherlands in the semifinal. Kuck, Hedrick and Hansen then beat the Dutch team by 0.4 seconds, with a final time of 3:42.71.

The American team were defeated by the Canadians in the gold medal final. The same trio that skated the semifinal trailed Canada in the gold medal final by as much as 0.73 seconds early in the race, trimming that margin to 0.21 at the finish with a time of 3:41.58.

Other career highlights 
 Nine-time World Cup individual medalist (2 gold, 1 silver, 6 bronze)
 Four-time World Cup Team Pursuit medalist (3 silver, 1 bronze)
 Member of the U.S. Long Track World Cup Team from 2009-2014 and 2016-2018

Personal life
Brian was born in Evanston, Illinois, and was raised in Glenview, Illinois with his brother Stevey.Hansen is coached by 4-time Olympian Nancy Swider-Peltz. Brian attended Glenbrook South High School in Glenview. After his participation at the 2014 Winter Olympics in Sochi, Brian took two years off to earn his bachelor's degree in business at the University of Colorado Boulder in Boulder, Colorado.

Personal bests - February 2018

Last updated February 10, 2018.

Source: http://www.isu.html.infostradasports.com

References

External links
 ISU profile
 
 
 Brian Hansen at US Speedskating

1990 births
Living people
American male speed skaters
Speed skaters at the 2010 Winter Olympics
Speed skaters at the 2014 Winter Olympics
Speed skaters at the 2018 Winter Olympics
Medalists at the 2010 Winter Olympics
Olympic silver medalists for the United States in speed skating
Marquette University alumni
Sportspeople from Evanston, Illinois